Si! Si! M.F. is an album released by jazz trumpeter Maynard Ferguson featuring tracks recorded in early 1962 and originally released on the Roulette label.

Reception 

AllMusic reviewer Scott Yanow stated "the boppish performances feature such soloists as altoist Lanny Morgan, the tenors of Willie Maiden and Don Menza and pianist Mike Abene. The arrangements (by Ernie Wilkins, Marty Paich, Don Sebesky, Don Rader, Maiden, Abene and Menza) took advantage of the band's many strengths and the result is a solid set of swinging music". The Penguin Guide to Jazz picked the arrangement of "Mimi" as a highlight and the playing on "Morgan's Organ" as the best on the album.

Track listing 
 "What'll I Do" (Irving Berlin) – 2:38
 "Early Hours" (Marty Paich) – 3:54
 "Morganpoint" (Don Sebesky) – 4:54
 "Si! Si! – M. F." (Don Rader) – 6:10
 "Almost Like Being in Love" (Frederick Loewe, Alan Jay Lerner) – 2:00
 "Mimi" (Don Menza) – 5:14
 "Morgan's Organ" (Ernie Wilkins) – 4:20
 "Born to Be Blue" (Robert Wells, Mel Tormé) – 3:35
 "Straight Out"  (Menza) – 3:31

Personnel 
Maynard Ferguson – trumpet, leader
Gene Arnold Goe, Natale Pavone, Donald Arthur Rader – trumpet
John C. Gale, Kenneth Harold Rupp – trombone
Lanny Morgan – alto saxophone
Willie Maiden – tenor saxophone, clarinet
Donald J. Menza – tenor saxophone
Frank J. Hittner, Jr. – baritone saxophone, bass clarinet
Michael Christian Joseph Abene – piano
Lincoln B. Milliman – bass
Rufus Jones – drums
Mike Abene (tracks 1 & 8), Don Menza (tracks 6 & 9), Marty Paich (track 2), Don Rader (track 4), Don Sebesky (tracks 3 & 5), Ernie Wilkins (track 7) – arrangers

References 

1962 albums
Maynard Ferguson albums
Roulette Records albums
Albums produced by Teddy Reig
Albums arranged by Ernie Wilkins
Albums arranged by Don Sebesky